Chowkham is a Tehsil in the Indian state of Arunachal Pradesh. Lohit is the name of the district that contains Tehsil Chowkham.

Chowkham is located 20 km towards West of District headquarters Tezu. It is 286 km from State capital Itanagar towards West. It is one of the 60 constituencies of Legislative Assembly of Arunachal Pradesh. Name of current MLA (October-2016) of this constituency is Chow Tewa Mein.

See also
List of constituencies of Arunachal Pradesh Legislative Assembly
Arunachal Pradesh Legislative Assembly

References

Villages in East Siang district